LBSC may refer to:
 California State University, Long Beach, California, United States
 Curly Lawrence (1883–1967), British model steam locomotive designer who wrote under the pen name 'L.B.S.C.' 
 London, Brighton and South Coast Railway, a former English railway company